The 4 arrondissements of the Oise department are:
 Arrondissement of Beauvais, (prefecture of the Oise department: Beauvais) with 245 communes. The population of the arrondissement was 229,183 in 2016.  
 Arrondissement of Clermont, (subprefecture: Clermont) with 146 communes.  The population of the arrondissement was 130,333 in 2016.  
 Arrondissement of Compiègne, (subprefecture: Compiègne) with 156 communes.  The population of the arrondissement was 182,266 in 2016.  
 Arrondissement of Senlis, (subprefecture: Senlis) with 132 communes. The population of the arrondissement was 281,760 in 2016.

History

In 1800 the arrondissements of Beauvais, Clermont, Compiègne and Senlis were established. The arrondissement of Clermont was disbanded in 1926, and restored in 1942.

References

Oise